Qi Jianhua (齐建华; born November 5, 1980) is a Chinese volleyball player. She currently plays club ball for Liaoning.

External links

Chinese women's volleyball players
1980 births
Living people
21st-century Chinese women